Monleras is a municipality located in the Northwest of province of Salamanca, Castile and León, Spain, near the Tormes river. According to the 2004 census (INE), the municipality has a population of 236 inhabitants.

References

Municipalities in the Province of Salamanca